The Zoo and Aquarium Association Australasia (ZAA), based in Sydney, Australia and Wellington, New Zealand, is an association of zoos, aquariums, sanctuaries and wildlife parks across Australia, New Zealand, Papua New Guinea and the South Pacific Islands, whose central goal is to support and verify animal welfare among its members and in the wild.

ZAA grants accreditation to zoos and aquariums that have clearly demonstrated their commitment to animal welfare. It uses the Five Domains Model, a progressive, science-based approach to welfare, from the animals' viewpoint, that underpins all that ZAA-accredited zoos and aquariums do. 

ZAA and its members lead over 100 breeding programs supporting conservation and community education. It also actively contributes to threatened species recovery around the world.

ZAA members collectively enhance the roles of individual zoos and aquariums in conserving wildlife. Each year they connects 22 million visitors with nature, educate 1.1 million students about wildlife, support 629 conservation programs, and contribute over $20 million to conservation.

ZAA facilitates shared knowledge among its members and continuous improvements in conservation, welfare, biosecurity, science, research, social and community programs.

Animal welfare

The Five Domains 
The Five Domains Model is a science-based structure for assessing animal welfare, which recognises that animals can experience feelings, ranging from negative to positive. It provides a best-practice framework to assess welfare in animals of all species and is used by all ZAA-accredited zoos and aquariums to assess animal welfare.

The first four domains (Nutrition, Environment, Health and Behaviour) all help inform us about the animal’s various experiences, which make up the fifth domain, the Mental Domain.

The Five Domains Model was developed by Professor David Mellor, founding Director of the Animal Welfare Science and Bioethics Centre at Massey University. It is the animal welfare assessment model adopted by the World Association of Zoos and Aquariums (WAZA) in their Animal Welfare Strategy.

ZAA Accreditation 
ZAA-accredited zoos and aquariums exist for the purpose of conservation, education, science, research and connecting people with nature. The one thing that must underpin everything else they do is positive animal welfare. ZAA doesn’t believe in settling with just “not bad”, the organisations want the animals under human care to experience “great” welfare and live fulfilling lives.

ZAA has a progressive, science-based approach to animal welfare. Using the Five Domains Model, the Association grants accreditation to zoos and aquariums that have clearly demonstrated their commitment to positive welfare. This approach champions welfare from the animal’s perspective and it underpins all that ZAA-accredited zoos and aquariums do.

By law, the government requires zoos and aquariums to meet minimum standards to protect animals from bad welfare. The ZAA Accreditation Program goes further, using the Five Domains to focus on good welfare. It asks the question, is the animal having a fulfilling life of positive experiences?

The Program assesses zoos and aquariums' commitment and achievements towards positive animal welfare. It requires them to think deeply about the welfare of the animals in their care and strive for continuous improvement.

Zoos and aquariums must provide compelling evidence for set criteria on both their operations and the experiences of their animals. This is reviewed by ZAA, before one of the Association's expert Accreditation Officers visits the site in-person to validate the findings. Accreditation reports must be sent to the Standards and Accreditation Committee and approvals endorsed by the ZAA Board before accreditation is granted.

The ZAA Animal Welfare Assessment Tool can be used to assess the welfare of any species and even allows for evidence of individual animals' preferences. Being evidence-based, the program can incorporate new research and technology as society increases its knowledge about the welfare of different species.

ZAA-accredited zoos and aquariums operate to the highest levels. They must be assessed every three years to retain their accreditation status. International members are assessed yearly.

Wildlife conservation

Zoo and aquarium conservation 
ZAA-accredited zoos and aquariums in Australasia are huge contributors to conservation in our part of the world and globally. They participate in 629 conservation programs for threatened species worldwide. In 2017, they funded a total of $20.6 million to conservation as well as a further $3.1 million of in-kind support.

Each year Australasian zoos and aquariums connect 22 million people with wildlife, fostering a love for our world's species and educating people about positive actions to help save them.

ZAA leads member zoos and aquariums to work together for conservation and threatened species recovery. It helps members work strategically through its Wildlife Conservation Committee and provides an avenue for funding through the Wildlife Conservation Fund (WCF). The ZAA team are also actively involved in a range of government recovery programs in Australia, New Zealand and globally to save threatened species including orange-bellied parrot, southern cassowary, Tasmanian devil, kiwi and more.

ZAA supports an approach that involves all the different experts working together to conserve a species – the One Plan Approach developed by the Conservation Planning Specialist Group (CPSG). ZAA's role is to aid collaboration between members zoos and aquariums and other key conservation partners, as well as provide expertise and recommendations.

Species and breeding programs 
ZAA leads the Australasian Species Management Program (ASMP), under which it coordinates over 100 breeding programs for a select group of species at ZAA-accredited sites across Australia, New Zealand and Papua New Guinea. Managed programs play a role in protecting threatened species, conservation research and conservation education. This approach involves managing the animals at different ZAA-accredited zoos and aquariums as one big population and supports genetically diverse and sustainable species populations.

Each ASMP species has a Species Coordinator, who uses specialised software to make recommendations about the breeding and management of that species. A team of experts on a particular group of animals (e.g. birds or reptiles) provide guidance to our Species Coordinators. This team is called a Taxon Advisory Group (TAG).

The ASMP manages animal populations for protection against extinction, release to the wild, conservation research and community education. A list of managed species can be accessed on the ZAA website.

Animal health and biosecurity 
Biosecurity is security against diseases and pests that could harm the native environment, economy or community. It is the precautions taken to lower the risk of spreading or introducing these pests or diseases.

Good biosecurity is important to zoos and aquariums because it helps to keep wildlife, both in human care and in the wild, safe and healthy. It also helps to protect our people, domestic animals and ecosystems.

ZAA works with its members, veterinarian professionals and the government to maintain and improve high standards of biosecurity. It does this by producing manuals and guidelines for good practice, conducting training, engaging with government, raising awareness, setting expectations for our members and educating the public.

The National Zoo Biosecurity Manual (NZBM) was produced as a cooperative initiative between the Zoo and Aquarium Association, the Wildlife Health Australia, the Commonwealth Department of Agriculture, Fisheries and Forestry and the Australian Zoo sector.

Guidelines (numbered sequentially for each section) outline the recommended practices to achieve best practice zoo biosecurity outcomes. The manual outlines both basic guidelines and higher level guidelines for all zoos.

Governance and Operations

The Zoo and Aquarium Association (ZAA) is overseen by a Board elected by the members. ZAA's headquarters are located in Sydney, Australia and are hosted by the Taronga Zoo. The ZAA New Zealand Branch office is hosted by Wellington Zoo in New Zealand.

Membership
The Zoo and Aquarium Association (ZAA) is a membership organisation that draws its strength from its members. As the peak body for zoos and aquariums in the Australasian region, ZAA has several categories of membership. The Australasian region includes: New Zealand, Australia, Papua New Guinea and South Pacific Islands.

Zoos and aquariums that wish to be regional or international members must achieve and maintain ZAA Accreditation for positive animal welfare.

See also
 List of zoo associations

Notes

References 
 Laura M. Mumaw (1991) ARAZPA: developing the Australasian zoo industry as a conservation resource International Zoo Yearbook 31 (1), 9–12.

External links 
 

1990 establishments in Australia
Zoo associations
Zoos in Australia